Caspian tyulka, Clupeonella caspia, is a species of fish in the family Clupeidae.  It is found in the Caspian Sea, also in the lower reaches of the rivers Volga, Ural, and possibly Terek. This is a brackishwater pelagic-neritic fish, up to 12 cm maximum length.

Previously the Caspian tyulka was considered to be a part of the more widespread Clupeonella cultriventris (subspecies C. cultriventris caspia),
 but that species is now thought to inhabit the Pontic basin only.

References

Sources

Clupeonella
Fish of Asia
Fish of Russia
Fish of the Caspian Sea
Fish described in 1941